The 14th American Society of Cinematographers Awards were held on February 20, 2000, honoring the best cinematographers of film and television in 1999.

Winners and nominees

Film

Outstanding Achievement in Cinematography in Theatrical Releases
 American Beauty – Conrad L. Hall
 The Insider – Dante Spinotti
 The Sixth Sense – Tak Fujimoto
 Sleepy Hollow – Emmanuel Lubezki
 Snow Falling on Cedars – Robert Richardson

Television

Outstanding Achievement in Cinematography in Miniseries or Television Film
 ''Introducing Dorothy Dandridge – Robbie GreenbergOutstanding Achievement in Cinematography in Regular Series The X-Files'' (Episode: "Agua Mala") – Bill Roe

Other awards

 ASC Heritage Award (Note: This year the award is named for Gregg Toland)
 Andrew Huebscher
 Christopher Popp
 Lifetime Achievement Award
 William A. Fraker
 Board of the Governors Award
 Warren Beatty
 International Award
 Oswald Morris
 President's Award
 Guy Green

References

1999
1999 film awards
1999 television awards
1999 in American cinema
1999 in American television
American